Mary James Gill  (born 28 August 1985) is a Pakistani politician who was a Member of the Provincial Assembly of the Punjab, from May 2013 to May 2018.

Early life and education
She was born on 28 August 1985.

She earned the degrees of Bachelor of Arts (Hons) with Roll of Honour in 2004 from Lahore College for Women University. In 2007, she received a degree of Bachelor of Laws.

Political career

She was elected to the Provincial Assembly of the Punjab as a candidate of Pakistan Muslim League (N) on a reserved seat for women in 2013 Pakistani general election.

References

1985 births
Living people
Punjab MPAs 2013–2018
Women members of the Provincial Assembly of the Punjab
Pakistan Muslim League (N) politicians
21st-century Pakistani women politicians